Backstage Pass is a first live album by Australian group Little River Band. The album was recorded by the Australian Broadcasting Commission at the Adelaide Festival Theatre in November 1978 and released in October 1979. It peaked at No. 18 on the Australian Kent Music Report

The album was released in United States as a double album in April 1980, including the group's next live album, Live in America.

Reception
Cash Box magazine said "This fine live package was recorded partly in Australia with the Adelaide Symphony Orchestra and partly during The Little River Band's 1979 North American tour, it is a splendid show- case of this versatile band's talents as the Aussie fivesome swims deftly through a sea of styles — folk, rock, country and A/C."

Track listing
Side A
"It's a Long Way There" (Graham Goble) - 8:55
"So Many Paths" (Glenn Shorrock, Ignatius Jones) - 4:36 
"Statue of Liberty" (Glenn Shorrock) - 3:24 
"Fall from Paradise" (Beeb Birtles, Graham Goble) - 6:13
Side B
"Light of Day" (Beeb Birtles) 9:43 
"Night and Day" (Intro) (Cole Porter) / "Reminiscing" (Graham Goble) - 4:16 
"The Man in Black" (Glenn Shorrock) - 4:37
"Help Is on Its Way" (Glenn Shorrock) - 3:54

Personnel
Little River Band
Glenn Shorrock - lead vocals
Graeham Goble - guitarist, backing vocals
Beeb Birtles - guitar, backing vocals
David Briggs  - lead guitar
Derek Pellicci  - drums
Additional personnel Record 1:
George McArdle  - bass guitar
Adelaide Symphony Orchestra conducted by David Measham
Additional personnel Record 2:
Barry Sullivan  - bass guitar
Mal Logan  - keyboards

Charts

Certifications

References

Little River Band albums
1979 live albums
EMI Records live albums